Dollar railway station served the village of Dollar, Clackmannanshire, Scotland from 1869 to 1964 on the Devon Valley Railway.

History 
The station opened on 3 May 1869 by the Devon Valley Railway. To the northeast was the goods yard and to the southeast was the signal box. To the east was Dollar Mine, which provided coal for Kincardine Power Station. The station closed to both passengers and goods traffic on 15 June 1964.

References

External links 

Disused railway stations in Clackmannanshire
Railway stations in Great Britain opened in 1869
Railway stations in Great Britain closed in 1964
Beeching closures in Scotland
1869 establishments in Scotland
1964 disestablishments in Scotland